Housebound (also titled Kitchen Privileges) is a 2000 American thriller film written and directed by Mari Kornhauser and starring Katharina Wressnig and Peter Sarsgaard.

Cast
Katharina Wressnig as Marie
Peter Sarsgaard as Tom
Angeline Ball as Mignon
Geoffrey Lower as Jarrid
Liz Stauber as Ricky
Ann Magnuson as Brandy

Release
The film premiered at the Montreal World Film Festival on September 2, 2000.

Reception
Eddie Cockrell of Variety gave the film a mixed review and wrote that "...Wressnig brings a fine Euro gravity to the updated Catherine Deneuve role, but viewers will be distracted by overly schematic and unconvincing production design."

Ron Wells of Film Threat gave it a positive review, praising Kornhauser "...for expressing some unfashionable compassion of a tale that demonstrates that two people, no matter how screwed up, can help each other if they open themselves up."

References

External links
 
 

2000s English-language films